Dongnae Station refers to two railroad stations in Busan, South Korea.

 Dongnae station (Korail)
 Dongnae station (Busan Metro)